Wikipedia features the following lists of netball players.

Players by country
 List of New Zealand international netball players

Team captains
 List of Australia national netball team captains

Leagues
 List of ANZ Championship players

Squads and rosters
Commonwealth Games
 Netball at the 2006 Commonwealth Games – Team rosters
 Netball at the 2018 Commonwealth Games — Rosters
World Cup
 2011 World Netball Championships squads
 2019 Netball World Cup squads

Medalists
 List of Commonwealth Games medallists in netball
 List of INF Netball World Cup medallists

 
Netball players
Players